Scholastic chess club may refer to:
 Chess club
 Scholastic chess in the United States